Urban Bushmen is a live album by the Art Ensemble of Chicago recorded in Munich in 1980 and released on the ECM label.

Reception

In his review for AllMusic, Stephen Cook stated Urban Bushmen not only provides an excellent summation of the Art Ensemble of Chicago's work since 1966, but also substantiates the group's reputation for putting on intense and inspired shows".

Track listing
 "Promenade: Cote Bamako I" (Don Moye) - 4:11
 "Bush Magic" (Malachi Favors, Moye) - 5:05
 "Urban Magic" (Art Ensemble of Chicago) - 15:45
 "Sun Precondition Two/Theme for Sco" (Moye/Joseph Jarman) - 21:53
 "New York Is Full of Lonely People" (Lester Bowie) - 7:37
 "Ancestral Meditation" (Art Ensemble of Chicago) - 6:56
 "Uncle" (Roscoe Mitchell) - 17:29
 "Peter and Judith" (Mitchell) - 2:39
 "Promenade: Cote Bamako II" (Moye) - 5:57
 "Odwalla/Theme" (Mitchell) - 5:14

Personnel
Lester Bowie: trumpet, bass drum, long horn, vocals
Malachi Favors Maghostut: bass, percussion, melodica, vocals
Joseph Jarman: saxophones, vocals, clarinets, bassoon, flutes, percussion
Roscoe Mitchell: saxophones, flute, percussion, clarinet, vocals
Don Moye: sun percussion, vocals

References

Art Ensemble of Chicago live albums
1980 live albums
ECM Records live albums
Albums produced by Manfred Eicher